
Gmina Chmielno is a rural gmina (administrative district) in Kartuzy County, Pomeranian Voivodeship, in northern Poland.

The gmina contains part of the protected area called Kashubian Landscape Park.

Villages
Gmina Chmielno contains the villages and settlements of Borzestowo, Borzestowska Huta, Chmieleńskie Chrósty, Chmielno, Chmielonko, Cieszenie, Dejk, Garcz, Glinno, Grodzisko, Haska, Koryta, Koszkania, Kożyczkowo, Łączyńska Huta, Lampa, Lipowiec, Maks, Miechucino, Miechucińskie Chrósty, Młyn Dolny, Młyn Górny, Przewóz, Rekowo, Reskowo, Rzym, Stary Dwór, Strysza Góra, Sznurki, Węgliska, Zajezierze and Zawory.

Neighbouring gminas
Gmina Chmielno is bordered by the gminas of Kartuzy, Sierakowice and Stężyca.

References
Polish official population figures 2006

Chmielno
Kartuzy County